A train station, railway station, railroad station, or railway depot is a railway facility where trains stop to load or unload passengers, freight, or both. It generally consists of at least one platform, one track, and a station building providing such ancillary services as ticket sales, waiting rooms, and baggage/freight service. If a station is on a single-track line, it often has a passing loop to facilitate traffic movements.

Places at which passengers only occasionally board or leave a train, sometimes consisting of a short platform and a waiting area but sometimes indicated by no more than a sign, are variously referred to as "stops", "flag stops", "halts", or "provisional stopping places". The stations themselves may be at ground level, underground, or elevated. Connections may be available to intersecting rail lines or other transport modes such as buses, trams, or other rapid transit systems.

Terminology 
Train station is the terminology typically used in the U.S. In Europe, the terms train station and railway station are both commonly used, with railroad being obsolete. In British and British Comonwealth nations usage, where railway station is the traditional term, the word station is commonly understood to mean a railway station unless otherwise specified.

In the United States, the term depot is sometimes used as an alternative name for station, along with the compound forms train depot, railway depot, and railroad depot—it is used for both passenger and freight facilities. The term depot is not used in reference to vehicle maintenance facilities in the U.S., whereas it is used as such in Canada and the United Kingdom.

History 

The world's first recorded railway station was The Mount on the Oystermouth Railway (later to be known as the Swansea and Mumbles) in Swansea, Wales, which began passenger service in 1807, although the trains were horsedrawn rather than by locomotives.
The two-storey Mount Clare station in Baltimore, Maryland, United States, which survives as a museum, first saw passenger service as the terminus of the horse-drawn Baltimore and Ohio Railroad on 22 May 1830.

The oldest terminal station in the world was Crown Street railway station in Liverpool, England, built in 1830, on the locomotive-hauled Liverpool to Manchester line. The station was slightly older than the still extant Liverpool Road railway station terminal in Manchester. The station was the first to incorporate a train shed. Crown Street station was demolished in 1836, as the Liverpool terminal station moved to Lime Street railway station. Crown Street station was converted to a goods station terminal.

The first stations had little in the way of buildings or amenities. The first stations in the modern sense were on the Liverpool and Manchester Railway, opened in 1830. Manchester's Liverpool Road Station, the second oldest terminal station in the world, is preserved as part of the Museum of Science and Industry in Manchester. It resembles a row of Georgian houses.

Early stations were sometimes built with both passenger and freight facilities, though some railway lines were goods-only or passenger-only, and if a line was dual-purpose there would often be a freight depot apart from the passenger station.

Dual-purpose stations can sometimes still be found today, though in many cases goods facilities are restricted to major stations.

Many stations date from the 19th century and reflect the grandiose architecture of the time, lending prestige to the city as well as to railway operations. Countries where railways arrived later may still have such architecture, as later stations often imitated 19th-century styles. Various forms of architecture have been used in the construction of stations, from those boasting grand, intricate, Baroque- or Gothic-style edifices, to plainer utilitarian or modernist styles. Stations in Europe tended to follow British designs and were in some countries, like Italy, financed by British railway companies.

Stations built more recently often have a similar feel to airports, with a simple, abstract style. Examples of modern stations include those on newer high-speed rail networks, such as the Shinkansen in Japan, THSR in Taiwan, TGV lines in France, and ICE lines in Germany.

Station facilities 

Stations usually have staffed ticket sales offices, automated ticket machines, or both, although on some lines tickets are sold on board the trains. Many stations include a shop or convenience store. Larger stations usually have fast-food or restaurant facilities. In some countries, stations may also have a bar or pub. Other station facilities may include: toilets, left-luggage, lost-and-found, departures and arrivals schedules, luggage carts, waiting rooms, taxi ranks, bus bays and even car parks. Larger or staffed stations tend to have a greater range of facilities including also a station security office. These are usually open for travellers when there is sufficient traffic over a long enough period of time to warrant the cost. In large cities this may mean facilities available around the clock. A basic station might only have platforms, though it may still be distinguished from a halt, a stopping or halting place that may not even have platforms.

Many stations, either larger or smaller, offer interchange with local transportation; this can vary from a simple bus stop across the street to underground rapid-transit urban rail stations.

In many African, South American, and Asian countries, stations are also used as a place for public markets and other informal businesses. This is especially true on tourist routes or stations near tourist destinations.

As well as providing services for passengers and loading facilities for goods, stations can sometimes have locomotive and rolling stock depots (usually with facilities for storing and refuelling rolling stock and carrying out minor repair jobs).

Station configurations 
In addition to the basic configuration of a station, various features set certain types of station apart. The first is the level of the tracks. Stations are often sited where a road crosses the railway: unless the crossing is a level crossing, the road and railway will be at different levels. The platforms will often be raised or lowered relative to the station entrance: the station buildings may be on either level, or both. The other arrangement, where the station entrance and platforms are on the same level, is also common, but is perhaps rarer in urban areas, except when the station is a terminus. Stations located at level crossings can be problematic if the train blocks the roadway while it stops, causing road traffic to wait for an extended period of time. Stations also exist where the station buildings are above the tracks. An example of this is Arbroath.

Occasionally, a station serves two or more railway lines at differing levels. This may be due to the station's position at a point where two lines cross (example: Berlin Hauptbahnhof), or may be to provide separate station capacity for two types of service, such as intercity and suburban (examples: Paris-Gare de Lyon and Philadelphia's 30th Street Station), or for two different destinations.

Stations may also be classified according to the layout of the platforms. Apart from single-track lines, the most basic arrangement is a pair of tracks for the two directions; there is then a basic choice of an island platform between, two separate platforms outside the tracks (side platforms), or a combination of the two. With more tracks, the possibilities expand.

Some stations have unusual platform layouts due to space constraints of the station location, or the alignment of the tracks. Examples include staggered platforms, such as at Tutbury and Hatton railway station on the Crewe–Derby line, and curved platforms, such as Cheadle Hulme railway station on the Macclesfield to Manchester Line. Stations at junctions can also have unusual shapes – a Keilbahnhof (or "wedge-shaped" station) is sited where two lines split. Triangular stations also exist where two lines form a three-way junction and platforms are built on all three sides, for example  and  stations.

Tracks 
In a station, there are different types of tracks to serve different purposes. A station may also have a passing loop with a loop line that comes off the straight main line and merge back to the main line on the other end by railroad switches to allow trains to pass.

A track with a spot at the station to board and disembark trains is called station track or house track regardless of whether it is a main line or loop line. If such track is served by a platform, the track may be called platform track. A loop line without a platform which is used to allow a train to clear the main line at the station only, it is called passing track. A track at the station without a platform which is used for trains to pass the station without stopping is called through track.

There may be other sidings at the station which are lower speed tracks for other purposes. A maintenance track or a maintenance siding, usually connected to a passing track, is used for parking maintenance equipment, trains not in service, autoracks or sleepers. A refuge track is a dead-end siding that is connected to a station track as a temporary storage of a disabled train.

Terminus 

A "terminus" or "terminal" is a station at the end of a railway line. Trains arriving there have to end their journeys (terminate) or reverse out of the station. Depending on the layout of the station, this usually permits travellers to reach all the platforms without the need to cross any tracks – the public entrance to the station and the main reception facilities being at the far end of the platforms.

Sometimes, however, the track continues for a short distance beyond the station, and terminating trains continue forwards after depositing their passengers, before either proceeding to sidings or reversing to the station to pick up departing passengers. Bondi Junction and Kristiansand Station, Norway, are like this.

A terminus is frequently, but not always, the final destination of trains arriving at the station. Especially in continental Europe, a city may have a terminus as its main railway station, and all main lines converge on it. In such cases all trains arriving at the terminus must leave in the reverse direction from that of their arrival. There are several ways in which this can be accomplished:
 arranging for the service to be provided by a multiple-unit or push–pull train, both of which are capable of operating in either direction; the driver simply walks to the other end of the train and takes control from the other cab; this is increasingly the normal method in Europe; and is very common in North America;
 by detaching the locomotive which brought the train into the station and then either
 using another track to "run it around" to the other end of the train, to which it then re-attaches;
 attaching a second locomotive to the outbound end of the train; or
 by the use of a "wye", a roughly triangular arrangement of track and switches (points) where a train can reverse direction and back into the terminal;
 historically, turntables were used to reverse steam engines.
There may also be a bypass line, used by freight trains that do not need to stop at the terminus.

Some termini have a newer set of through platforms underneath (or above, or alongside) the terminal platforms on the main level. They are used by a cross-city extension of the main line, often for commuter trains, while the terminal platforms may serve long-distance services. Due to the disadvantages of terminus stations there have been multiple cases in which one or several terminus stations were replaced with a new through-station, including the cases of Berlin Hauptbahnhof, Vienna Hauptbahnhof and numerous examples throughout the first century of railroading. Stuttgart 21 is a controversial project involving the replacement of a terminus station by a through-station.

An American example of a terminal with this feature is Union Station in Washington, DC, where there are bay platforms on the main concourse level to serve terminating trains and standard island platforms one level below to serve trains continuing southwards. The lower tracks run in a tunnel beneath the concourse and emerge a few blocks away to cross the Potomac River into Virginia.

Terminus stations in large cities are by far the biggest stations, with the largest being Grand Central Terminal in New York City. Other major cities, such as London, Boston, Paris, Istanbul, Tokyo, and Milan  have more than one terminus, rather than routes straight through the city. Train journeys through such cities often require alternative transport (metro, bus, taxi or ferry) from one terminus to the other. For instance, in Istanbul transfers from the Sirkeci Terminal (the European terminus) and the Haydarpaşa Terminal (the Asian terminus) historically required crossing the Bosphorus via alternative means, before the Marmaray railway tunnel linking Europe and Asia was completed. Some cities, including New York, have both termini and through lines.

Terminals that have competing rail lines using the station frequently set up a jointly owned terminal railroad to own and operate the station and its associated tracks and switching operations.

Stop 
During a journey, the term station stop may be used in announcements, to differentiate a halt during which passengers may alight for another reason, such as a locomotive change.

While a junction or interlocking usually divides two or more lines or routes, and thus has remotely or locally operated signals, a station stop does not. A station stop usually does not have any tracks other than the main tracks, and may or may not have switches (points, crossovers).

Intermediate station 
An intermediate station does not have any other connecting route, unlike branch-off stations, connecting stations, transfer stations and railway junctions. In a broader sense, an intermediate station is generally any station on the route between its two terminal stations.

The majority of stations are, in practice, intermediate stations. They are mostly designed as through stations; there are only a few intermediate stations that take the form of a stub-end station, for example at some zigzags. If there is a station building, it is usually located to the side of the tracks. In the case of intermediate stations used for both passenger and freight traffic, there is a distinction between those where the station building and goods facilities are on the same side of the tracks and those in which the goods facilities are on the opposite side of the tracks from the station building.

Intermediate stations also occur on some funicular and cable car routes.

Halt 

A halt, in railway parlance in the Commonwealth of Nations and Ireland, is a small station, usually unstaffed or with very few staff, and with few or no facilities. In some cases, trains stop only on request, when passengers on the platform indicate that they wish to board, or passengers on the train inform the crew that they wish to alight.

United Kingdom
The Great Western Railway in Great Britain began opening haltes on 12 October 1903; from 1905, the French spelling was Anglicised to "halt". These GWR halts had the most basic facilities, with platforms long enough for just one or two carriages; some had no raised platform at all, necessitating the provision of steps on the carriages. Halts were normally unstaffed, tickets being sold on the train. On 1 September 1904, a larger version, known on the GWR as a "platform" instead of a "halt", was introduced; these had longer platforms, and were usually staffed by a senior grade porter, who sold tickets and sometimes booked parcels or milk consignments.

From 1903 to 1947 the GWR built 379 halts and inherited a further 40 from other companies at the Grouping of 1923. Peak building periods were before the First World War (145 built) and 1928–1939 (198 built). Ten more were opened by British Rail on ex-GWR lines. The GWR also built 34 "platforms".

However, most have had the word halt removed from their names.

A number of other halts are still open and operational on privately owned, heritage, and preserved railways throughout the British Isles. In addition, the word is often used informally to describe national rail network stations with limited service and low usage, such as the Oxfordshire Halts on the Cotswold Line. It has also sometimes been used for stations served by public services but accessible only by persons travelling to/from an associated factory (for example IBM near Greenock and British Steel Redcar– although neither of these is any longer served by trains), or military base (such as Lympstone Commando) or railway yard. The only two such "private" stopping places on the national system where the "halt" designation is still officially used seem to be Staff Halt (at Durnsford Road, Wimbledon) and Battersea Pier Sidings Staff Halt, both of which are solely for railway staff.

Other countries
In Ireland, a few small railway stations are designated as "halts" (sing. ).

In some Commonwealth countries the term "halt" is used.

In Australia, with its sparse rural populations, such stopping places are common on lines that are still open for passenger traffic. In the state of Victoria, for example, a location on a railway line where a small diesel railcar or railmotor can stop on request to allow passengers to board or alight is called a rail motor stopping place. It is often designated solely by a sign beside the railway at an access point near a road. The passenger can hail the driver to stop, and can buy a ticket from the train guard or conductor. In South Australia, such places were called "provisional stopping places". They were often placed on routes on which "school trains" (services conveying children from rural localities to and from school) operated.

In rural and remote communities across Canada and the United States, passengers wanting to board the train at such places had to flag the train down to stop it, hence the name "flag stops" or "flag stations".

Accessibility 
Accessibility for disabled people is mandated by law in some countries. Considerations include:

 Elevators or ramps to every platform are necessary for people in wheelchairs who cannot use stairs, and also allow those with prams, bicycles, and luggage to reach the platform more easily and safely
 Minimising the platform gap in both height and width. This also requires rolling stock with appropriate dimensions. At some stations, a railway worker can install a temporary ramp to allow people in wheelchairs to board. Relying on temporary ramps can lead to people in wheelchairs becoming stranded on a train or platform if a staff member fails to show up to deploy the ramp.
 Station facilities such as accessible toilets, payphones, and audible announcements
 Tactile paving to warn visually impaired people that they are approaching a platform edge. Platform screen doors also physically prevent people from falling from the platform edge.
In the United Kingdom, rail operators will arrange alternative transport (typically a taxi) at no extra cost to the ticket holder if the station they intend to travel to or from is inaccessible.

Goods stations 

Goods or freight stations deal exclusively or predominantly with the loading and unloading of goods and may well have marshalling yards (classification yards) for the sorting of wagons.  The world's first goods terminal was the 1830 Park Lane Goods Station at the South End Liverpool Docks. Built in 1830, the terminal was reached by a  tunnel.

As goods are increasingly moved by road, many former goods stations, as well as the goods sheds at passenger stations, have closed. In addition, many goods stations today are used purely for the cross-loading of freight and may be known as transshipment stations, where they primarily handle containers. They are also known as container stations or terminals.

Records

Worldwide 

 The world's busiest passenger station, with a passenger throughput of 3.5 million passengers per day (1.27 billion per year), is Shinjuku Station in Tokyo.
 The world's station with most platforms is Grand Central Terminal in New York City with 44 platforms.
 The world's highest station above ground level (not above sea level) is Smith–Ninth Streets subway station in New York City.
 Coney Island – Stillwell Avenue in New York City is the world's largest elevated terminal with 8 tracks and 4 island platforms.
 Shanghai South railway station, opened in June 2006, has the world's largest circular transparent roof.

Europe 

Busiest
 Gare du Nord, in Paris, is by the number of travellers, at around 214 million per year, the busiest railway station in Europe, the 24th busiest in the world and the busiest outside Japan.
 , in London, is Europe's busiest station by daily rail traffic with 100 to 180 trains per hour passing through.
 Zürich HB is the busiest terminus in Europe by the volume of rail traffic.

Largest
 Leipzig Hbf is the biggest railway station in Europe in terms of floor area.
 München Hbf and Rome Termini are the largest railway station by number of platforms (32).

Highest
 Jungfraujoch railway station is the highest railway station in the European continent.

North America 
 New York Penn Station is the busiest station in the Western Hemisphere.
 Toronto's Union Station is the busiest station in Canada.

Gallery

See also 

 Bus station
 Bus terminus
 Freight station
 List of IATA-indexed railway stations
 List of railway stations
 Metro station
 Running in board
 Station building

Notes

References

External links 

 A comprehensive technical article about stations from Railway Technical Web Pages

 
Passenger rail transport
Railway buildings and structures